Kesagami may refer to:

Kesagami Provincial Park, Ontario, Canada
Kesagami River, a tributary of the Harricana River in northeastern Ontario, Canada
Little Kesagami River,  a tributary of the Kesagami River in Northeastern Ontario, Canada
Kesagami Lake, a lake in northeastern Ontario, Canada